The 2017 Vuelta a Murcia was the 37th edition of the Vuelta a Murcia road cycling one day race. It was part of the 2017 UCI Europe Tour, as a 1.1 categorised race.

In the sprint finish from a select group of 20 riders, Jhonatan Restrepo took second place ahead of 's Patrick Konrad.

Teams
Twenty teams were invited to take part in the race. These included six UCI WorldTeams, eight UCI Professional Continental teams, five UCI Continental teams and a Spanish national team.

Result

References

External links

2017 UCI Europe Tour
2017 in Spanish road cycling
2017